One Big Happy may refer to:

 One Big Happy (comic strip)
 One Big Happy (TV series)